Black Hills Ammunition is an American ammunition and reloading supplies manufacturing company based in Rapid City, South Dakota.

Description
Black Hills is popular among Cowboy Action Shooters (see SASS, the Single Action Shooting Society) because they produce ammunition in a number of obsolete calibers, such as .44 Russian, .38 Long Colt, .44-40 and others.

The exclusive distributor for Black Hills Ammunition in the United Kingdom is Edgar Brothers.

References

External links
Black Hills Ammunition

Companies based in South Dakota
Rapid City, South Dakota
Ammunition manufacturers
American companies established in 1981
1981 establishments in South Dakota